Vilive Miramira “On The Wall” (born 21 March 1999) is a Fijian rugby union player, currently playing for the . His preferred position is flanker.

Professional career
Miramira was named in the Fijian Drua squad for the 2022 Super Rugby Pacific season.

References

External links
 

1999 births
Living people
Fijian rugby union players
Rugby union flankers
Fijian Drua players